The FA Cup is broadcast live in the United Kingdom by BBC Sport and ITV Sport from the 2021-22 season and around the world by the respective broadcasting rights holders. This broadcast package is included in The FA package (FA Cup only for BBC Sport), which contains: FA Community Shield (aired before the FA Cup seasons starts) and possible England U-21 Home Internationals.

Summary of FA Cup broadcasters

United Kingdom  
Both of these broadcasters will air the tournament until 2024-25 season.

Additional matches featuring Welsh clubs may feature on BBC Wales or on Welsh language channel S4C.

Worldwide 
These broadcasters will air the tournament until 2023-24 season.

References 

FA Cup
FA Cup